Nicholas Scratch is a supervillain appearing in American comic books published by Marvel Comics. He is predominantly a foe of the Fantastic Four and Patsy Walker.

Publication history

Nicholas Scratch first appeared in Fantastic Four #185 (August 1977) and was created by Len Wein (writer) and George Pérez (artist).

The name "Nicholas Scratch" is an amalgam of colloquial and euphemistic names for the Devil: "Old Nick" and "Old Scratch" or "Mr. Scratch" (as used in "The Devil and Daniel Webster").

Fictional character biography
Nicholas Scratch is the son of Agatha Harkness and was a resident of the hidden community of New Salem, Colorado, a secret community populated by magic users. Agatha left the reclusive community to live among normal people, and in time even became a nanny to Franklin Richards, son of Reed and Sue Richards of the Fantastic Four. Scratch fathered seven children, who would come to be known as Salem's Seven. Scratch, now a warlock, became the leader of New Salem and brought the community to believe that it had been betrayed by Harkness through her dealings with the outside world. The New Salem witches then abducted Agatha for her trial and execution. They also abducted Franklin Richards in the process, which then caused the Fantastic Four to follow them back to New Salem. Although initially defeated and captured, the Four escaped and confronted Scratch at Harkness's trial, where all of the New Salem community was present. They countered Scratch's claims against Harkness by explaining that they hadn't known of New Salem until Scratch's actions made them aware of it. Outraged, Scratch attacked, swaying the community against him. The New Salem community then exiled him and banished him to a dimension known as the Dark Realm.

From the Dark Realm, Scratch restored the Salem's Seven's powers and took mental control of the Fantastic Four. He attempted a world conquest, but was thwarted and confined to the Dark Realm by Agatha Harkness. From the Dark Realm, he later took mental possession of Franklin Richards. He had Salem's Seven takeover New Salem, but was defeated by Agatha Harkness and Gabriel, Devil Hunter. Scratch's powers were removed by Harkness, leaving him as a normal human being. Agatha Harkness eventually disowned Scratch as her son.

Later, after the destruction of New Salem, Scratch resurfaced in the town of Centerville as "Mayor Nicholas."  The whole town of Centerville and all of its inhabitants had entered a contract as an amusement park version of "America's Heartland Next-Door." When Patsy Walker returned to visit her hometown, she discovered that the town's whole population was possessed by demons. A team composed of Avengers and Thunderbolts helped clear the town, which was apparently being victimized by a convoluted conspiracy composed of the amusement park developers, the Sons of the Serpent, and Salem's Seven. After defeating them, the Avengers/Thunderbolts team departed but Patsy elected to remain in Centerville.

Soon Patsy discovered that Scratch was the mastermind behind the ongoing haunting of Centerville. She defeated him and accused him of serving Mephisto, but in reply, Scratch called down his true new master Dormammu. Abducting Hellcat, Dormammu then revealed his plans for domination via conquest of Hell, and that Scratch would become Sorcerer Supreme. Dormammu's plans were later defeated by the other Hell Lords causing Hell to freeze over. Dormammu then fled with Scratch.

Scratch had not been seen until he was featured in The Resurrection of Nicholas Scratch three-part storyline in Marvel Knights 4 where Scratch manipulated Salem's Seven and the Fantastic Four into releasing Shuma-Gorath only for the Fantastic Four, Diablo, Doctor Strange, and his own children to defeat him and Shuma-Gorath. Scratch was banished to Hell, where he made an alliance with Mephisto.

Powers and abilities
Scratch possesses vast indeterminate power through manipulation of the forces of magic. He has teleported, fired bolts of force and energy, traveled between dimensions, shown the ability to control and influence minds, and animated gargoyles to serve him. He could gain more power by tapping into extradimensional energy in entities or objects of power existing in dimensions tangential to Earth's. He had the mental powers of mesmerism, thought-casting, illusion-casting, and mental-probing. For a time, Nicholas Scratch was deprived of his supernatural powers by a spell cast by Agatha Harkness.

Scratch wields the Satan Staff, a mystical power object that served as a focus for Scratch's magical powers. With it, he could direct the combined magical powers of the entire community of New Salem when they allowed him to do so.

In other media

Television
 Nicolas Scratch appears in The Avengers: United They Stand episode "The Sorceress Apprentice" voiced by Stephen Ouimette.

References

External links
 Nicholas Scratch at Marvel.com
 

Characters created by George Pérez
Characters created by Len Wein
Comics characters introduced in 1977
Fantastic Four characters
Marvel Comics characters who can teleport
Marvel Comics characters who use magic
Marvel Comics supervillains